Sporothrix is a ubiquitous genus of soil-dwelling fungus discovered by Schenck in 1898 and studied in more detail by Hektoen and Perkins. The first described and best known species is Sporothrix schenckii, the causative agent of rose handler's disease. New environmental and pathogenic species have been discovered with the potential for more to be found as molecular techniques advance.

Other species in this genus include Sporothrix brasiliensis and Sporothrix globosa.

References

External links

Sordariomycetes genera
Ophiostomatales